Whitstable Harbour railway station was the name of two disused railway stations serving  Whitstable the terminus of the Canterbury and Whitstable Railway. The station opened in 1830. It was extended in the mid-1870s and resited in 1895. The Canterbury and Whitstable line closed to passengers in 1931 and freight in 1952, although it was reopened for a month following the North Sea flood of 1953.

History
The original station was opened on 2 May 1830. It was located north of Harbour Street. Whitstable Harbour was built by Thomas Telford. It was opened on 19 March 1832. In 1847, coke ovens were erected at Whitstsable Harbour. In the mid-1870s, the station was extended. A brick-built booking office was provided and the platform was extended to take three carriages. The coke ovens closed in 1880 when the South Eastern Railway switched to using Welsh steam coal to fuel its locomotives. The layout of the original station meant that when passenger trains were using it, the shunting of wagons was impeded. In 1895, a new passenger station was built south of Harbour Street, opening on 3 June.

The Canterbury and Whitstable Railway closed to passengers on 1 January 1931. The signal box at the station closed on 11 February 1931, with the line being worked as a siding thereafter. The line remained open to freight until 1 December 1952. Following the North Sea flood of 1953, the railway was reopened on 5 February, closing on 28 February.

References
Citations

Sources

External links

Crab and Winkle Line Trust - charity seeking to bring the C&WR route back into public use for cycling and walking

Disused railway stations in Kent
Former South Eastern Railway (UK) stations
Railway stations in Great Britain opened in 1830
Railway stations in Great Britain closed in 1895
Railway stations in Great Britain opened in 1895
Railway stations in Great Britain closed in 1931
Whitstable
1830 establishments in England
1952 disestablishments in England